Tuna Altuna and Václav Šafránek were the defending champions but only Altuna chose to defend his title, partnering Elias Ymer. Altuna lost in the first round to Julio Peralta and Horacio Zeballos.

Harri Heliövaara and Henri Laaksonen won the title after defeating Zdeněk Kolář and Gonçalo Oliveira 6–4, 6–3 in the final.

Seeds

Draw

References
 Main Draw

Båstad Challenger - Doubles
2018 Doubles
Bast